The Wikepa are an indigenous Australian people, one of the Wik tribes of the Cape York Peninsula of northern Queensland.

Languages
Wikepa (Wik-Epa) was one of the Wik languages. According to Peter Sutton, Wikepa or wikiita were used by an older generation of Cape Keerweer people to denote the dialect employed by two clans in the area of the middle Kirke River, and bore the strongest similarities to those spoken by the Wikmean clan.

Country

People
The Wikepa were close to extinction by the post-war period, with only a small number known to be dwelling at an Aurukun mission in 1958.

Alternative names
 Wik-Eppa.
 Wik-Iita.

Notes

Citations

Sources

Aboriginal peoples of Queensland